Leptosteges parthenialis is a moth in the family Crambidae. It was described by Harrison Gray Dyar Jr. in 1917. It has been recorded from the US states of Florida, Louisiana and Oklahoma.

The wingspan is about 13 mm. Adults have been recorded on wing from May to August.

References

Moths described in 1917
Schoenobiinae